Gareth Owen may refer to:

Gareth Owen (academic) (1922–2002), principal of Aberystwyth University, 1979–1989
Gareth Owen (footballer, born 1971), Welsh football player and manager
Gareth Owen (footballer, born 1982), Welsh football player
Gareth Owen (pianist), British classical pianist
Gareth Owen (presenter) (born 1984), Welsh TV presenter
Gareth Owen (rugby union) (born 1988), Welsh rugby union player
Gareth Owen (English rugby league) (born 1992), English rugby league footballer
Gareth Owen (Welsh rugby league), rugby league footballer of the 1980s for Wales and Oldham
Gareth Owen (sound designer) (born 1977), British theatrical sound designer
Gareth Owen (writer), Birmingham writer and poet see Birmingham Arts Lab

See also
Gary Owen (disambiguation)